Mark Jackson (born 1965) is an American former basketball guard and former head coach of the Golden State Warriors.

Mark or Marc Jackson may also refer to:

Arts and entertainment
Mark Jackson, R&B musician and member of the 1950s American R&B group the Crows
Marc Evan Jackson (born 1970), American comedian and actor
Mark Jackson (musician) (born 1970), English musician, member of VNV Nation
Mark Jackson (actor) (born 1982), English actor known for his appearance as Isaac on The Orville

Sports

American football
Mark Jackson (quarterback) (born 1954), American football player
Mark Jackson (wide receiver) (born 1963), American football player
Mark Jackson (athletic director) (born 1972), American football coach/administrator

Other sports
Mark Jackson (Australian footballer) (born 1959), Australian rules footballer and actor
Mark Jackson (hurdler) (born 1969), Canadian track and field athlete
Marc Jackson (born 1975), American professional basketball player
Mark Jackson (footballer, born 1977), English footballer
Mark Jackson (speed skater) (born 1980), New Zealand Olympic speed skater

Others
Mark Jackson (curator) (born 1976), American British curator